Brigadier General Dr. Mikuláš Ferjenčík (6 December 1904 – 4 March 1988) was a Czechoslovak military veterinarian, resistance fighter, and exiled politician.  In 1992 he was posthumously promoted to the rank of General of the Army.

Biography
Ferjenčík was born in Polomka, Slovakia (at the time a part of the Austro-Hungarian Empire).  He graduated from high school in Rožňava and the University of Veterinary and Pharmaceutical Sciences in Brno, before serving in the military veterinary service.  By the outbreak of World War II he was chief of the Slovak Army Veterinary Service with the rank of lieutenant colonel.  During the war he joined the Czechoslovakian resistance and participated in the Slovak National Uprising as chief of staff to Ján Golian.

On 4 August 1944, Ferjenčík was part of a delegation from the Slovak National Council that flew to Moscow carrying detailed plans of their uprising against the Nazis.  The papers were confiscated and he was held for a month before being released on 5 September and returning to Czechoslovakia.

After the war he was promoted to brigadier general. He then served on the Board of Commissioners in the Third Czechoslovak Republic, first as Commissioner of Defence and later as Commissioner of the Interior.

Following the 1948 coup d'état, Ferjenčík emigrated to the United States.  On arrival in New York he was picketed as responsible for the USSR's seizure of Czechoslovakia and immediately taken to Ellis Island as a suspected communist.  He was subsequently active in Czechoslovakian immigrant politics, becoming director of the Czechoslovak National Council of America.

Ferjenčík died in Denver, Colorado on 4 March 1988.  In 1992 he was posthumously promoted to the rank of General of the Army.

References

Further reading

External links

 Mikuláš Ferjenčík (Czech) in the Chamber of Deputies of the Parliament of the Czech Republic

1904 births
1988 deaths
People from Brezno District
People from the Kingdom of Hungary
Members of the Interim National Assembly of Czechoslovakia
Male veterinarians
Czechoslovak democracy activists
Czechoslovak military personnel of World War II
Czechoslovak emigrants to the United States
Recipients of the Milan Rastislav Stefanik Order